Oceans and Fisheries may refer to:

 Ministry of Oceans and Fisheries of South Korea
 Minister of Fisheries and Oceans of Canada
 Department of Fisheries and Oceans of Canada

See also 

 List of agriculture ministries
 Aquaculture
 Fishery
 Ocean